The Sloedam was a dam, connecting the Dutch islands Zuid-Beveland and Walcheren near the town of Arnemuiden. Before the dam was constructed, these islands were separated by a stretch of water called the Sloe. The Sloedam was constructed in 1871 for the railway connection between the towns of Flushing and Roosendaal, the so-called Zeeuwse Lijn (Zealandic Line). After World War II, the areas to the south of the dam were poldered. Since the Veerse Gat estuary was closed off by the Veerse Gatdam in 1961, the Sloedam no longer functions as a primary defense against the sea.

World War II
During World War II, two battles were fought on and around the Sloedam.

Battle of Zeeland 

In May 1940, the area was contested during the German invasion of the Low Countries in the Battle of Zeeland. A combined French-Dutch force under brigadier-general Marcel Deslaurens attempted to stop the German invasion, but was unsuccessful.

Battle of Walcheren Causeway 

In 1944-1945, heavy fighting came to the area when the Allies attempted to clear the Western Scheldt, entrance to the harbor of Antwerp. After heavy fighting, Zeelandic Flanders (south of the Scheldt) and Zuid-Beveland (to the north) were freed from German control by Canadian forces. However, Walcheren island, north of the river mouth, still contained a large German force that controlled access to the Western Scheldt. De Sloedam was the only access road to the former island of Walcheren.

The Canadians reached the dam from Zuid-Beveland. The Germans were well prepared, and had established multiple well-prepared mortar sites that allowed them to fire on every point of the dam. The Canadian attempts to reach Walcheren all failed. Two Dutch resistance fighters offered their assistance to the Canadians. They knew the sandbars of the Sloe that ran dry during low tide and they led a patrol to Walcheren that managed to mark the dry area. After a short reconnaissance of the German positions, the patrol returned to Zuid-Beveland. The next day, a large Canadian unit managed to cross the Sloe, once again aided by the resistance men. After reaching the island of Walcheren, it attacked the German positions from the rear, managing to capture the mortar positions. The main Canadian force then crossed the Sloedam and established a beachhead on the Walcheren end. Operation Infatuate, the capture of Walcheren, was about to commence.

References

Dams in Zeeland
Buildings and structures in Middelburg, Zeeland
Walcheren
Zuid-Beveland